Tasawaq (Tuareg name: Tesăwăq), sometimes also called Ingelshi, is a Northern Songhay language spoken by the Issawaghan or Ingalkoyyu, a community surrounding the town of In-Gall in Niger. A closely related variety called Emghedeshie was spoken in Agadez but is now extinct.

It shares some similarities with Berber languages, like the Tamasheq. For example in booth Languages, the grammatical gender of a Nomen is female if it begins and ends with the letter t.

References

Songhay languages
Languages of Niger